Opera Lyrica is an opera company based in Oxford, England, composed of young professionals. It was founded in May 2012 by Paola Cuffolo (Artistic Director) and  Nick Simpson (General Director), and was granted charitable status in August 2013 to increase public accessibility to the art form and to provide performance and work experience in staged opera productions for singers, instrumentalists, conductors, directors and technical crew in the early stages of their careers. The company's first two productions were staged in collaboration with St Peter's College Opera at Oxford University.

Production history
Double bill of Mozart's Der Schauspieldirektor and Die Zauberflöte in collaboration with St Peter's College Opera, St. Peter's College Chapel, Oxford,  24, 26, 27 October 2012 
Rossini's The Barber of Seville in collaboration with St Peter's College Opera, St. Peter's College Chapel, Oxford,  8, 10, 11 May 2013
Handel's Acis and Galatea performed in venues across London and the South of England, October/November 2013
Mozart's Così fan tutte in the 20th Century Theatre, Notting Hill, 4, 5 September 2014
Blow's Venus and Adonis and Purcell's Dido and Aeneas performed in venues across London and the South of England, February 2015

References

External links
 Official website

British opera companies
Musical groups established in 2012
2012 establishments in England